The Catlin Court Historic District, established in 1914, is significant for its historic association with an important period in the development of the city of Glendale, Arizona, United States.

History
Glendale was founded by William John Murphy in 1892 and was incorporated as a town in 1910.  Glendale's economy depended mainly on the agricultural products produced in its farmlands. It wasn't until 1902, when the Beet Sugar Factory was built and established in the town, that the town began to grow. The demand of new housing made the real estate around the Glendale Town site a profitable venture.

Subdivision
Various businessmen invested in the lands around the town site. Among the investors were Lafayette Myers, president of the Glendale State Bank and Otto R. Hansen, a businessman from Wisconsin. By 1914, Hansen subdivided the land in the area into residential lots which he named "Catlin Court" (after his wife's maiden name). Myers together with A.A. Carrick, a local businessman, formed a real estate agency to promote the sale of the lots. Catlin Court became the first organized building expansion and development program in the city.

Architecture
The most common architectural style of the homes are that of the bungalow. Homes in this style which can still be found here are the Otto R. Hansen House, C.M. Wood House" and Green McBee/J.B. Ingram House.

The Catlin Court Historic District is located in the area bounded by Gardenia Ave., 59th Ave., Palmarie Ave. and 58th Ave. The district was listed in the National Register of Historic Places on June 9, 1992. It is the first of ten districts in Glendale to be designated as historical by the National Register of Historic Places. The other nine are the 59th Avenue Residential Historic District, Floralcroft Historic District, Glendale Gardens Historic District, Glendale Tract Historic District, Northfield Historic District, Myrtle Avenue Residential Historic District, Sage Acres Historic District, Sands Estate Historic District and Thunderbird Estates and The McDonald Addition Historic District.

Historic houses

The following is a brief description with the images of some of the houses found in the Catlin Court Historic District. These historic houses are listed as part of the Glendale Townsite Catlin Court Historic District and were therefore listed in the National Register of Historic Places on June 9, 1992. The houses are also considered as significantly historical by the Glendale Historic Building Survey of 1980 and the Glendale Historic Society.

 The Victor Messinger House - built in 1897 and located at 7141 N. 59th Avenue. Messinger was Glendle's first city clerk and founder of the town's first library.
 The C.H. Tinker House - built in 1913 and located at 6838 N. 59th Drive.Listed in the National Register of Historic Places on January 11, 2006, reference: #05001504.
 The McDaniels House - an early 1900s house which was owned by the McDaniels family in 1951. It is located at 7123 W. 58th Ave. It has been used as a restaurant and other commercial ventures.
 The Methodist Church parsonage house - built in 1898, was moved to 7142 N. 58th Avenue and is now an antique store.
 The C. E. Allen House - the Allen family occupied the house in 1924. 7142 N 58th Drive is now a Chalk Paint furniture restoration and gift store.
 The Bears & More House - built in 1920 and located at 7146 N. 58th Avenue.
 The W.W. Ireland House - built in 1919 and located at 7213 N. 58th Avenue. W.W. Ireland was a local tin smith and sheet metal worker. The property is listed in the "Glendale Historic Building Survey, City of Glendale, 1980".
 The Collins Stone House - built in 1941 and located at 7214 N 58th Ave.
 The J.F. Eberle Rental House - built in 1921 and located at 7221 N. 58th Avenue. J.F. Eberle was an early pioneer who was involved in Glendale's dry goods and grocery business.
 The Verne Whitney House - built in 1919 and located 7162 N. 58th Ave. Whitney was a rural mail carrier.
 The W.G. Bell House - built in 1940 and located at 7240 N. 58th Avenue.
 The C.H. Keaton House - built in 1920 and ilocated at 7308 N. 58th Avenue. The property is listed in the "Glendale Historic Building Survey, City of Glendale, 1980".
 The Frank Carden House - built in 1936 and located at 7149 N. 58th Drive. Frank Carden operated a men's clothing store downtown, and also became a justice of the peace.
 The Phillip Marshall House - built in 1930 and located at 7153 N. 58th Drive. Philip Marshall was co-owner of the Marshall Brothers Barber Shop.
 The Christian Church Bungalow - built in 1917 and located at 7154 N. 58th Drive. Now known as Manor at Catlin Court, it is the only bungalow church in Arizona.
 The Harry Madison House - built in 1920 and located at 7157 N. 58th Drive. Harry H. Madison owned a bakery in Glendale.
 The Floyd Holmes Sine House - built in c. 1917 and located at 7163 N. 58th Drive. Floyd was the first of the Sine brothers to move to Glendale. Together with his brothers he founded the Sine Hardware Store.
 The C.M. Wood House - built in 1919 and located at 7222 N. 58th Drive. It belonged to G. W. Protzman and later to Mr. Wood, a prominent Glendale pharmacist.
 The E.J. Barnes/Sharp House - built in 1919 and located at 7229 N. 58th Drive.
 The Delbert Lower/ J.A. Ireland House - built in 1918 and located at 7230 N. 58th Drive.
 The Appleby/McRuer House - built in 1917 and located at 7248 N. 58th Drive. It belonged to G. A. Appleby, president of the Commerce Bank, and later to Duncan McRuer, principal of Glendale High School.
 The Green McAbee/ J.C. Kenton House - built in 1918 and located at 7302 N. 58th Drive. Listed in the "Glendale Arizona Historic Society".
 The C.E. Walker House - built in 1928 and located at 7321 N. 58th Drive.
 The Meyer House - built in the early 1900s and located at 7138 N 57th Dr.
 The First Baptist Church Parsonage House - built in 1919 and located at 7150 N 57th Ave.
 The Apartments - built in the early 1900s and located at 7153 N 57th Dr.
 The Julio Sancet House (aka the Hickman House) - built in 1919 and located at 7158 North 57th Avenue. It was the home of Julio Sancet, a local rancher, from 1919 through the 1930s.
 The Myrtle Apartments - built in the early 1900s and located on the corner of Myrtle Ave. & 57th Dr.
 The F.M. Staggs/ Marty Robbins House - built in 1919 and located at 5804 W. Myrtle Ave. Frank M. Staggs was a local carpenter and contractor. Marty Robbins (1925 – 1982), who was inducted into the Country Music Hall of Fame in 1982, had both a music and racing career
 The Kenneth L. Alien House - built in the early 1900s and located at 5808 W. Myrtle Ave.
 The Wadia Daou/ Mansour Daou House - built in 1935 and located at 5824 W. Myrtle.
 The Otto Hansen House - built in 1917 and located at 5834 W. Myrtle. The house belonged to Otto Hansen, originator of the Catlin Court subdivision.
 The House - built in 1930 and located on 5808 W. Northview Ave.
 The Eberle Rental House - built in 1920 and located at 5819 W. Northview Ave.
 The Monterey Style House - built in 1940 and located at 5820 W. Northview Ave.
 The Louis Myers House - built in 1918 and located at 5803 W. State Ave. Louis Myers was the president of the Glendale State Bank who played a major role in the establishment and development of the Catlin Court District in Glendale.
 The David Roberts House - built in 1920 and located at 5808 W. State Ave. It was built for Reverend Roberts, an Englishman who served as minister of the Glendale First Methodist church in 1921.
 The Kalas House - built in 1927 and located at 5811 W. State St. The house was the residence of Dr. William Kalas, who once served as mayor of Glendale.
 The Roberts House - built in 1925 and located at 5812 W. State Ave.
 The Earl Smith House - built in 1945 and located at 5819 W. State Ave.
 The Isaac Imes House - built in 1920 and located at 5823 W. State Ave. Isaac Imes was a teacher and school principal. One of Glendale's elementary schools is named after him.
 The C.A. Jemison House - built in 1919 and located at 5824 W. State Ave. It was once the residence of C.A. Jemison, a cashier for the First National Bank of Glendale.
 The J.D. Howell House - built in 1919 and located at 5854 W. State Ave. John David Howell was a building contractor who was responsible for the design and construction of the first Glendale High School.
 The William E. Argo House - built in the early 1900s and located at 5811 W. Gardenia Ave.
 The Russell Carr House - built in the early 1900s and located at 5808 W. Gardenia Ave.

See also

 Adobe Mountain Desert Park
 Manistee Ranch
 Sahuaro Ranch
 Glendale Memorial Park Cemetery
 USS Arizona salvaged artifacts
 List of National Historic Landmarks in Arizona
 List of historic properties in Glendale, Arizona
 National Register of Historic Places listings in Arizona
 National Register of Historic Places listings in Phoenix, Arizona
 National Register of Historic Places listings in Maricopa County, Arizona

References

Further reading
 "Glendale, Arizona (Images of America Series)"; By: Carol J. Coffelt St. Clair and Charles S. St. Clair; Publisher: Arcadia Publishing SC; .
 "Glendale, Arizona (Then & Now Series)": By: Debbie Veldhuis; Publisher: Arcadia Publishing SC; .

Buildings and structures in Glendale, Arizona
Houses in Maricopa County, Arizona
Historic districts on the National Register of Historic Places in Arizona
Historic district contributing properties in Arizona
National Register of Historic Places in Maricopa County, Arizona
Houses on the National Register of Historic Places in Arizona
1914 establishments in Arizona
Bungalow architecture in Arizona